This article contains information about the literary events and publications of 1943.

Events
January 4 – Thomas Mann completes Joseph der Ernährer (Joseph the Provider) in California, the last of his Joseph and His Brothers (Joseph und seine Brüder) tetralogy, on which he began in December 1926.
February 4 – The première of Bertolt Brecht's The Good Person of Szechwan (Der gute Mensch von Sezuan) takes place at the Schauspielhaus Zürich in Switzerland, with Leonard Steckel directing.
March – The self-illustrated children's novella The Little Prince by the exiled French aviator Antoine de Saint-Exupéry, the all-time best-selling book originated in French, is published in New York.
May – A strongly antisemitic production of Shakespeare's The Merchant of Venice is staged at the Burgtheater in Vienna, with Werner Krauss as Shylock.
June 30 – Having transferred from the Merchant Marine to the United States Navy and served eight days of active duty Jack Kerouac is honorably discharged on psychiatric grounds. In New York City, he, William S. Burroughs and Allen Ginsberg become friends.
September
George Orwell resigns from the BBC to become literary editor of the left-wing London paper Tribune.
Retreating German forces set fire to the library of the Royal Society of Naples, and on September 30 to the Montesano Villa containing the most valuable State Archives of Naples.
September 9 – The première of Bertolt Brecht's Life of Galileo (Leben des Galilei, 1939) is held at the Schauspielhaus Zürich in Switzerland, with Leonard Steckel directing and playing the title role.
October – Tristan Bernard is arrested, but subsequently released from the Drancy internment camp in France after public protests.
October 14 – The contents of Biblioteca della Comunità Israelitica in Rome are looted by Nazi German troops.
December
Philip Larkin, with a degree from the University of Oxford, takes his first post as a librarian in Wellington, Shropshire.
Philip Van Doren Stern sends copies of his story "The Greatest Gift" to friends as a Christmas card.
unknown dates
Isaac Bashevis Singer becomes a naturalized U.S. citizen.
Publication begins of a new comprehensive edition of Friedrich Hölderlin's complete works (the Sämtliche Werke, or Große Stuttgarter Ausgabe).
The Federal Bureau of Investigation in the United States places Richard Wright under surveillance.

New books

Fiction
Lars Ahlin – Tåbb with the Manifesto (Tåbb med manifestet)
Sabahattin Ali – Madonna in a Fur Coat (Kürk Mantolu Madonna)
Sholem Asch – The Apostle
Marcel Aymé – The Passer through Walls (Le Passe-muraille)
Nigel Balchin – The Small Back Room
Vaikom Muhammad Basheer – Premalekhanam
Vicki Baum – Hotel Berlin
Henry Bellamann – Victoria Grandolet
Georges Bernanos – Monsieur Ouine
Marjorie Bowen – Airing in a Closed Carriage
Ivan Bunin – Dark Avenues («Тёмные аллеи», Tyomnyye allei, short stories, first edition)
 Victor Canning – Green Battlefield
John Dickson Carr (as Carter Dickson) – She Died A Lady
Raymond Chandler – The Lady in the Lake
Peter Cheyney – You Can Always Duck
Colette – Le Képi
 Freeman Wills Crofts – The Affair at Little Wokeham
Simone de Beauvoir – She Came to Stay (L'Invitée)
Pierre Drieu La Rochelle – The Man on Horseback (L'Homme à cheval)
Howard Fast – Citizen Tom Paine
Carlo Emilio Gadda – Gli anni
Jean Genet (anonymously) – Our Lady of the Flowers (Notre Dame des Fleurs)
Anthony Gilbert – The Mouse Who Wouldn't Play Ball
Robert Graves – Claudius the God
Elizabeth Janet Gray – Adam of the Road
Graham Greene – The Ministry of Fear
Hermann Hesse – The Glass Bead Game (Das Glasperlenspiel)
Michael Innes – The Weight of the Evidence
Aleksander Kamiński (as Juliusz Górecki) – Kamienie na szaniec (Stones for the Rampart)
C. S. Lewis – Perelandra
Clarice Lispector – Near to the Wild Heart (Perto do coração selvagem)
 Richard Llewellyn – None but the Lonely Heart
 E. C. R. Lorac – Death Came Softly
H. P. Lovecraft – Beyond the Wall of Sleep (collection)
Compton Mackenzie –  Keep the Home Guard Turning
Naguib Mahfouz – Rhadopis of Nubia
 Ngaio Marsh – Colour Scheme
Bruce Marshall – Yellow Tapers for Paris
 Gladys Mitchell 
 Sunset Over Soho
 The Worsted Viper
C. L. Moore – Earth's Last Citadel
Robert Musil (died 1942) – The Man Without Qualities (Der Mann ohne Eigenschaften, publication concludes, uncompleted)
Kate O'Brien – The Last of Summer
E. Phillips Oppenheim – Mr. Mirakel
Roger Peyrefitte – Les Amitiés particulières (Special Friendships)
J. B. Priestley – Daylight on Saturday
Ellery Queen – There Was an Old Woman
Ayn Rand – The Fountainhead
Betty Smith – A Tree Grows in Brooklyn
Margit Söderholm – Sunshine Follows Rain
 Cecil Street 
 Dead on the Track
 Men Die at Cyprus Lodge
Antal Szerb – The Queen's Necklace (A királyné nyaklánca)
Phoebe Atwood Taylor
Going, Going, Gone
Proof of the Pudding
File for Record (as Alice Tilton)
Kylie Tennant – Ride on Stranger
Denton Welch – Maiden Voyage
H. G. Wells – Crux Ansata
Dorothy Whipple – They Were Sisters
Chancellor Williams – The Raven
Virginia Woolf (suicide 1941) – A Haunted House and Other Short Stories

Children and young people
Enid Blyton
The Mystery of the Burnt Cottage
The Magic Faraway Tree
Virginia Lee Burton – The Little House
Eleanor Estes – Rufus M.
Roald Dahl – The Gremlins
Esther Forbes – Johnny Tremaine
C. S. Forester – The Ship
Mary Norton – The Magic Bed Knob; or, How to Become a Witch in Ten Easy Lessons
Arthur Ransome – The Picts and the Martyrs
Antoine de Saint-Exupéry – Le Petit Prince (The Little Prince)
Malcolm Saville – Mystery at Witch End (first in the Lone Pine series of twenty books)
Laura Ingalls Wilder – These Happy Golden Years

Drama
Bertolt Brecht
The Good Person of Szechwan (Der gute Mensch von Sezuan)
Life of Galileo (Leben des Galilei)
Albert Camus – The Misunderstanding (Le Malentendu)
Moss Hart – Winged Victory
 Frank Harvey – Brighton Rock
Fritz Hochwälder – Das Heilige Experiment (The Holy Experiment, The Strong Are Lonely)
Esther McCracken – Living Room
Elena Miramova – Dark Eyes
M. J. Molloy – Old Road
Armijn Pane – Kami, Perempuan (We, the Women)
J. B. Priestley – They Came to a City
Terence Rattigan - While the Sun Shines
Nelson Rodrigues – Vestido de Noiva (The Wedding Dress)
Jean-Paul Sartre – The Flies (Les Mouches)
Yang Jiang – As You Desire (Chenxin ruyi)

Non-fiction
Georges Bataille – L'Expérience intérieure
James Burnham – The Managerial Revolution
Julius Evola – The Doctrine of Awakening (La dottrina del risveglio)
Katharine Butler Hathaway – The Little Locksmith
Louis Hjelmslev – Prolegomena to a Theory of Language (Omkring sprogteoriens grundlæggelse)
C. S. Lewis – The Abolition of Man
John Neal – Observations on American Art: Selections from the Writings of John Neal (1793-1876) (edited by Harold Edward Dickson)
Reinhold Niebuhr – The Nature and Destiny of Man
Martin Noth – Uberlieferungsgeschischtliche Studien: Die sammelnden und bearbeitenden Geschichtswerke im Alten Testament
N. Porsenna – Visul Profetic (On the Prophetic Dream)
Jean-Paul Sartre – Being and Nothingness (L'Être et le néant: Essai d'ontologie phénoménologique)
J. A. Schumpeter – Capitalism, Socialism and Democracy
I. C. Vissarion – Energie mecanică în lumea în care ne găsim (Mechanic Energy for This World We Now Inhabit)
Edna Walling – Gardens in Australia
William Foote Whyte – Street Corner Society
Stefan Zweig (suicide 1942) – The World of Yesterday (first English edition)

Births
January 4
Doris Kearns Goodwin, American political biographer
Hwang Sok-yong, Korean novelist
Jesús Torbado, Spanish novelist (died 2018)
Priit Vesilind, Estonian-American author and photographer
January 8 – Charles Murray, American political science writer (The Bell Curve)
January 11 – Jim Hightower, American radio host and author
January 13 – Lorna Sage, English scholar and biographer (died 2001)
February 8 – Pirzada Qasim, Pakistani poet and academic
February 15 – Elke Heidenreich, German journalist and writer
February 16 – Graham Lord, Rhodesian-born English literary biographer and novelist (died 2015)
February 18 – Graeme Garden, Scottish-born writer, comedian and actor
February 21 – Lyudmila Ulitskaya, Russian fiction writer
February 22 – Terry Eagleton, English scholar and publicist
February 27 – Sheila Rowbotham, English feminist author
March 26 – Bob Woodward, American journalist
April 6 – Max Clifford, English publicist
April 17 – Gwynne Dyer, Canadian journalist
April 22 – Louise Glück, American poet, recipient of the Nobel Prize in Literature
April 30 – Paul Jennings, English-born Australian children's author
May 5 – Michael Palin, English comedy writer and television broadcaster
May 7 – Peter Carey, Australian novelist
May 8 – Pat Barker, English novelist
May 20 – Justin Cartwright, South African-born novelist (died 2018)
June 7 
Nikki Giovanni, American author, poet and educator
Michael Pennington, English writer, actor and director
June 10 – Simon Jenkins, English journalist
June 15 – Xaviera Hollander, Dutch East Indies-born writer
July 14 – Christopher Priest, English novelist
July 16 – Reinaldo Arenas, Cuban writer (died 1990)
August 2 – Rose Tremain (Rosemary Thomson), English novelist
August 30 – Robert Crumb, American cartoonist
September 12 – Michael Ondaatje, Ceylonese-born Canadian novelist and poet
September 24 – Antonio Tabucchi, Italian writer, academic and translator (died 2012)
October 5 – Michael Morpurgo, English children's writer
October 8 - R. L. Stine, American novelist
October 9 – L. E. Modesitt, Jr., American fantasy and science fiction writer
October 17 – Laila al-Othman, Kuwaiti writer
November 5 – Sam Shepard, American playwright, writer and actor
November 6 – Berlie Doherty (Beryl Hollingworth), English children's and young-adults' writer
November 7 – Stephen Greenblatt, American Shakespeare scholar
November 12 – Wallace Shawn, American actor and dramatist
December 9 – Joanna Trollope, English novelist
unknown dates
Christine Evans, Welsh poet in English
Vicki Feaver, English poet and academic
Hadrawi (Mohamed Ibrahim Warsame), Somali poet
Ebrahim Hussein, Tanzanian playwright in Swahili

Deaths
January 3 – F. M. Cornford, English classicist and poet (born 1874)
January 9 – R. G. Collingwood, English philosopher and historian (born 1889)
January 13 – Else Ury, German children's fiction writer (killed in Auschwitz concentration camp; born 1877)
February 1 – Lola Szereszewska, Polish-Jewish poet and journalist (born 1895)
March 10 – Laurence Binyon, English poet and scholar (born 1869)
March 13 – Stephen Vincent Benét, American author (born 1898)
April 7 – Jovan Dučić, Herzegovina Serb poet and diplomat (born 1871)
April 29 – Sidney Keyes, English poet (killed in action; born 1922)
April 30 – Beatrice Webb, English sociologist, economist and social reformer (born 1858)
May 27 – Arthur Mee, English encyclopedist and writer (born 1875)
May 29 – Guido Mazzoni, Italian poet (born 1859)
June 17 – Annie S. Swan ('David Lyall'), Scottish novelist and journalist (born 1859)
June 28 – Frida Uhl, Austrian writer and translator (born 1872)
July 18 – Miyake Kaho, Japanese novelist, essayist and poet (born 1868)
c. August 8 – Haig Acterian (Mihail), Romanian poet, dramatist and journalist (missing in action; born 1904)
August 12 – Kurt Eggers, Nazi German writer, poet, songwriter and playwright (killed in action; born 1905)
August 22 – Virgilio Dávila, Puerto Rican poet and politician (born 1869)
August 24 – Simone Weil, French philosopher (born 1909)
October 3 – Ida Lee, Australian historian and poet (born 1865)
October 7 – Radclyffe Hall, English novelist and poet (born 1880)
November 19 – Georg Hermann, German fiction writer (killed in Auschwitz concentration camp; born 1871)
November 27 – Louis Esson, Australian poet and playwright (born 1878)
November 30 – Etty Hillesum, Dutch correspondent and diarist (killed in Auschwitz concentration camp; born 1914)
December 2
Drummond Allison, English poet (killed in action; born 1921)
Nordahl Grieg, Norwegian poet and author (born 1902)
December 22 – Beatrix Potter, English children's writer and illustrator (born 1866)

Awards
Frost Medal: Edna St. Vincent Millay
James Tait Black Memorial Prize for fiction: Mary Lavin, Tales from Bective Bridge
James Tait Black Memorial Prize for biography: G. G. Coulton, Fourscore Years
Newbery Medal for children's literature: Elizabeth Janet Gray, Adam of the Road
Nobel Prize for literature: not awarded
Prix Goncourt: Marius Grout, Passage de l'Homme
Pulitzer Prize for Drama: Thornton Wilder, The Skin of Our Teeth
Pulitzer Prize for Poetry: Robert Frost: A Witness Tree
Pulitzer Prize for the Novel: Upton Sinclair – Dragon's Teeth

References

 
Years of the 20th century in literature